Ghaem Eslamikhah (born January 17, 1995) is an Iranian football midfielder who last played for Iranian club Mes Rafsanjan in the Iran Pro League.

References

Living people
1995 births
Iranian footballers
People from Kohgiluyeh and Boyer-Ahmad Province
Association football midfielders
Iran under-20 international footballers
Persian Gulf Pro League players
Tractor S.C. players
Mes Rafsanjan players
Machine Sazi F.C. players